Deylam-e Olya (also Romanized as Deylam-e ‘Olyā; also known as Boneh-ye Zobeydeh) is a village in Shamsabad Rural District, in the Central District of Dezful County, Khuzestan Province, Iran. At the 2006 census, its population was 143, in 19 families.

References 

Populated places in Dezful County